Global Sources is a Hong Kong-based business-to-business (B2B) multichannel media company that serves buyers and suppliers online and offline since 1971. Its core business facilitates trade between suppliers and buyers, through trade shows, online marketplaces, the management magazine Chief Executive China, apps and other virtual products.

Global Sources organizes many professional sourcing fairs in Hong Kong every year in response to the development of Guangdong-Hong Kong-Macao Greater Bay Area. These includes the world 's largest electronic product sourcing fair - Global Sources Electronics, Indonesia which connects China with Southeast Asia market under the “Belt and Road Initiative”. Global Sources is also a majority shareholder in Shenzhen International Machinery Manufacturing Industry Exhibition (SIMM), the leading machinery exhibitions in Southern China, and its related shows.

The company launched its China Sourcing Fairs in 2003.

 Global Sources Exhibitions, which bring international buyers face-to-face with suppliers. Specialized shows take place in Hong Kong,
 Private sourcing events, which create opportunities for pre-selected suppliers to meet privately with buyers representing retail chains.
 Global Sources online marketplaces, which allow buyers to contact manufacturers directly for inquiries and purchases.
 Chief Executive China, which feature thousands of informative supplier advertisements. Each of the 16 industry titles provides reports on new products and trends in sourcing. Print, digital and mobile app editions are available.

In February 2018, UK-based Clarion Events (owned by The Blackstone Group) completed its acquisition of Global Sources supported by Blackstone.

In July 2018, Hu Wei, formerly President of Reed Exhibitions Greater China,  was appointed as the CEO of Global Sources.

References 

1970 establishments in Hong Kong
Companies listed on the Nasdaq
Mass media companies of Hong Kong
Mass media companies established in 1970
Trade fairs in China
Magazine publishing companies of Hong Kong